"Right to Be Wrong" is a song by English singer and songwriter Joss Stone from her second studio album, Mind Body & Soul (2004). Written by Stone, Desmond Child and Betty Wright, the track was released in the United Kingdom on 29 November 2004 as the album's second single. It peaked at number 29 on the UK Singles Chart, where it stayed for six weeks. It was later included on the 2011 compilation album The Best of Joss Stone 2003–2009. The song was covered in Spanish by Mexican rock singer Alejandra Guzmán on her 2004 album Lipstick, retitled "Tengo Derecho a Estar Mal" (meaning "I've Got the Right to Be Wrong").

Stone performed a folk version of the song when she made a cameo appearance as herself in the third season of the American series American Dreams, in the episode "Starting Over", which aired on 30 January 2005.

Critical reception
Entertainment Weekly's David Browne says that "Right to Be Wrong, [is] a weirdly defensive song given Stone's out-of-the-gate success". Yahoo! Music's Dan Gennoe called it "late night smoulder".

Commercial performance
"Right to Be Wrong" debuted and peaked at number 29 on the UK Singles Chart. In United States, the song peaked at numbers 10 and 27 on the Billboard Adult Alternative Airplay and Adult Top 40, respectively.

Track listings
UK CD single
 "Right to Be Wrong" – 4:39
 "The Player" – 4:42
 "Don't Know How" (live performance from AOL Sessions) – 5:27

UK 7-inch single and European CD single
 "Right to Be Wrong" – 4:39
 "Jet Lag" (acoustic live performance from AOL Sessions) – 4:21

US promo CD
 "Right to Be Wrong" (radio edit) – 3:59

Personnel

Musicians
 Joss Stone – lead vocals, backing vocals
 Betty Wright – backing vocals
 Bombshell – backing vocals
 AJ Nilo – guitar
 Jack Daley – bass
 Cindy Blackman – drums
 Benny Latimore – piano
 Raymond Angry – Hammond organ
 Tom "Bones" Malone – flugelhorn
 Angelo Morris – Fender Rhodes

Production
 Michael Mangini – production, mixing
 Steve Greenberg – production
 Betty Wright – production
 Steve Greenwell – engineering, mixing

Charts

Release history

References

2000s ballads
2004 singles
2004 songs
Alejandra Guzmán songs
EMI Records singles
Joss Stone songs
Music videos directed by Liz Friedlander
Relentless Records singles
Songs written by Betty Wright
Songs written by Desmond Child
Songs written by Joss Stone
Virgin Records singles